The Chief of Air Force is the most senior appointment in the Royal Malaysian Air Force and has been held by a four-star officer in the rank of General (equivalent to Air Chief Marshal) since 1996. The Chief of Air Force is a member of the Malaysian Armed Forces Council and directly reports to the Chief of Defence Forces (CDF).

The current Chief of Air Force is General Dato' Sri Mohd Asghar Khan Goriman Khan – who succeeded General Tan Sri Datuk Seri Ackbal Abdul Samad on 4 March 2022. General Tan Sri Affendi Buang promoted into CDF on 2 January 2020 thus making him the second Chief of Air Force ever to hold the highest post in the Malaysian Armed Forces.

Appointees
Up to the year 2022, 20 people had appointed to the number 1 rank in the Royal Malaysian Air Force since 1957.

See also 

 Royal Malaysian Air Force
 Chief of Defence Forces (Malaysia)
 Chief of Army (Malaysia)
 Chief of Navy (Malaysia)

References 

Royal Malaysian Air Force
Military of Malaysia
Ministry of Defence (Malaysia)